The Superior Femenino de la Liga Puerto Rico is a women's football competition organized by the Puerto Rican Football Federation that currently is the top division football league in the island. It was announced via Facebook by the Federation in August 2018.

Champions

History

Liga PR Femenino
In 2018, the league was established. While the league did foster some success, it does not have a major sponsorship and lacks media coverage.

Women's teams
The following teams participate in the women's competition:

References

 
Puerto Rico
Puerto Rico